La Grange Historic District may refer to:

in the United States (by state)
LaGrange Commercial Historic District, LaGrange, Georgia, listed on the National Register of Historic Places (NRHP)
 La Grange Village Historic District in La Grange, Illinois, listed on the NRHP in Cook County
LaGrange (Harris Crossroads, North Carolina), a historic district listed on the NRHP
 La Grange Historic District (North Carolina), NRHP-listed
 La Grange Historic District (La Grange, Tennessee), NRHP-listed

See also
Greenville Street-LaGrange Street Historic District, Newnan, Georgia, listed on the NRHP in Coweta County
Fayette County Courthouse Square Historic District, La Grange, Texas, listed on the NRHP
 Lagrange (disambiguation)